This is a list of municipalities in North Macedonia which have standing links to local communities in other countries known as "town twinning" (usually in Europe) or "sister cities" (usually in the rest of the world).

B
Bitola

 Bayside, Australia
 Bursa, Turkey
 Épinal, France
 Kranj, Slovenia
 Pleven, Bulgaria
 Požarevac, Serbia
 Rijeka, Croatia
 Stari Grad (Belgrade), Serbia
 Trelleborg, Sweden
 Veliko Tarnovo, Bulgaria

D
Delčevo

 Blagoevgrad, Bulgaria
 Bornova, Turkey
 Goražde, Bosnia and Herzegovina
 Jagodina, Serbia
 Mladost (Varna), Bulgaria
 Simitli, Bulgaria
 Vyshhorod, Ukraine
 Żyrardów, Poland

Demir Hisar
 Prijedor, Bosnia and Herzegovina

G
Gevgelija

 Inđija, Serbia
 Jablanica, Bosnia and Herzegovina
 Nova Gorica, Slovenia
 Pazin, Croatia
 Sevlievo, Bulgaria

Gostivar

 Akhisar, Turkey
 Kilis, Turkey
 Smolyan, Bulgaria
 Stari Grad (Sarajevo), Bosnia and Herzegovina

K
Kavadarci

 Boljevac, Serbia
 Dobrich, Bulgaria
 Gornji Milanovac, Serbia
 Kemalpaşa, Turkey
 Kovin, Serbia
 Makarska, Croatia
 Năsăud, Romania
 Panagyurishte, Bulgaria
 Pernik, Bulgaria
 Pleven, Bulgaria
 Rožaje, Montenegro

Kičevo
 Vratsa, Bulgaria

Kočani

 Kazanlak, Bulgaria
 Kranj, Slovenia
 Križevci, Croatia
 Pereiaslav, Ukraine
 Szigetszentmiklós, Hungary

Kratovo
 Kolomyia, Ukraine

Kriva Palanka

 Bansko, Bulgaria
 Dupnitsa, Bulgaria
 Lugoj, Romania
 Mława, Poland
 Perechyn, Ukraine
 Svidník, Slovakia
 Vršac, Serbia
 Županja, Croatia

Kumanovo

 Banja Luka, Bosnia and Herzegovina
 Bijeljina, Bosnia and Herzegovina
 Câmpina, Romania
 Çorlu, Turkey
 Čukarica (Belgrade), Serbia
 Gabrovo, Bulgaria
 Gornji Milanovac, Serbia
 Leskovac, Serbia
 Nikšić, Montenegro
 Novi Sad, Serbia
 Pančevo, Serbia
 Plovdiv, Bulgaria
 Vranje, Serbia

N
Negotino

 Črnomelj, Slovenia
 Gradiška, Bosnia and Herzegovina
 Nagykáta, Hungary

O
Ohrid

 Budva, Montenegro
 Caen, France
 Givatayim, Israel
 Inđija, Serbia
 Kragujevac, Serbia
 Mostar, Bosnia and Herzegovina
 Pogradec, Albania
 Piran, Slovenia
 Safranbolu, Turkey
 Stari Grad (Sarajevo), Bosnia and Herzegovina

 Vidovec, Croatia
 Vinkovci, Croatia
 Windsor, Canada
 Wollongong, Australia
 Yalova, Turkey

P
Prilep

 Asenovgrad, Bulgaria
 Chernihiv, Ukraine

 Garfield, United States
 Tire, Turkey
 Topoľčany, Slovakia
 Vincent, Australia

Probištip
 Aleksinac, Serbia

R
Radoviš

 Aliağa, Turkey
 Belišće, Croatia
 Çınarcık, Turkey
 Contursi Terme, Italy
 Dryanovo, Bulgaria
 Ergene, Turkey
 Kamianets-Podilskyi, Ukraine
 Selçuk, Turkey
 Taşköprü, Turkey
 Teteven, Bulgaria
 Vaslui, Romania
 Velika Plana, Serbia
 Zaprudnya, Russia

Rosoman
 Bergama, Turkey

S
Skopje

 Bradford, England, United Kingdom
 Chlef, Algeria
 Dijon, France
 Dresden, Germany
 Istanbul, Turkey
 Ljubljana, Slovenia
 Manisa, Turkey
 Nanchang, China
 Nuremberg, Germany
 Pittsburgh, United States
 Podgorica, Montenegro
 Roubaix, France
 Sarajevo, Bosnia and Herzegovina
 Suez, Egypt
 Tempe, United States
 Tirana, Albania
 Waremme, Belgium
 Zagreb, Croatia
 Zaragoza, Spain

Skopje – Aerodrom
 Pazardzhik, Bulgaria

Skopje – Centar

 Beyoğlu, Turkey
 Stari Grad (Belgrade), Serbia

Skopje – Gjorče Petrov

 Kraljevo, Serbia
 Krasna Polyana (Sofia), Bulgaria
 Kuşadası, Turkey
 Považská Bystrica, Slovakia

Skopje – Karpoš

 New Belgrade (Belgrade), Serbia
 Sremski Karlovci, Serbia
 Stari Grad (Sarajevo), Bosnia and Herzegovina
 Tivat, Montenegro
 Travnik, Bosnia and Herzegovina
 Triaditsa (Sofia), Bulgaria
 Vrnjačka Banja, Serbia

Štip

 Balıkesir, Turkey
 Gyöngyös, Hungary
 Kavarna, Bulgaria
 Split, Croatia

Struga

 Mangalia, Romania
 Waterbury, United States

Strumica

 Bijelo Polje, Montenegro
 Copceac, Moldova
 Elektrostal, Russia
 Grójec, Poland
 Piacenza, Italy

T
Tetovo
 Sterling Heights, United States

V
Veles

 Çan, Turkey
 Celje, Slovenia
 Cherbourg-en-Cotentin, France
 Karşıyaka, Turkey
 Nowogard, Poland
 Princes' Islands, Turkey
 Samobor, Croatia
 Slobozia, Romania
 Sombor, Serbia
 Svishtov, Bulgaria
 Thermaikos, Greece
 Užice, Serbia
 Zenica, Bosnia and Herzegovina

References

North Macedonia
North Macedonia geography-related lists
Populated places in North Macedonia
Foreign relations of North Macedonia
Cities in North Macedonia